is a 1955 black-and-white Japanese film directed by Tomu Uchida.

It is a "gruelling cruel tale" from the Edo period.

Daisuke Katō won the 1956 Blue Ribbon Award for best supporting actor.

Plot
The samurai Sakawa Kojūrō is on the road to Edo with his two servants Genta and Genpachi. Kojūrō is a kindly master, but his character totally changes when he consumes alcohol. On the road, they encounter many different people: a traveling singer with her child, a father taking his daughter Otane to be sold into prostitution, a pilgrim, a policeman searching for a notorious thief, and Tōzaburō, the suspicious man the officer has his eyes on. Genpachi, the spear carrier, is also followed by an orphaned boy named Jirō who wants to be a samurai. When Kojūrō and Genpachi inadvertently capture the thief—who was the pilgrim in disguise—Kojūrō is disgusted when the authorities praise him and not his servant, even though Genpachi probably contributed more. He is also upset that he does not have the money to save Otane from being sold. In the end it is Tōzaburō who saves Otane, using the money he saved to rescue his own daughter, but decided to use for Otane after finding out his daughter had died. Depressed, Kojūrō takes Genta out drinking, despite the protests of the latter. When a band of boisterous samurai complain of Kojūrō drinking with someone of lower birth, Kojūrō gets upset. The samurai pull their swords and kill both the servant and his master. Genpachi arrives too late, but in a fury kills all the samurai with the spear. Authorities do not charge him with a crime, so he heads home carrying the ashes of Kojūrō and Genta. When Jirō tries to follow him, he shoos him off, telling him never to become a samurai.

Cast

References

External links 
 

Japanese black-and-white films
1955 films
Films directed by Tomu Uchida
Toei Company films
Jidaigeki films
Samurai films
Japanese adventure drama films
1950s adventure drama films
1950s Japanese films